The 2010 All-Pacific-10 Conference football team consists of American football players chosen by various organizations for All-Pacific-10 Conference teams for the 2010 Pacific-10 Conference football season. The Oregon Ducks won the conference, posting a 9–0 conference record. Oregon then lost to SEC champion Auburn Tigers in the BCS National Championship game 22 to 19. Stanford quarterback Andrew Luck was voted Pac-10 Offensive Player of the Year. Oregon State defensive tackle Stephen Paea was voted Pat Tillman Pac-10 Defensive Player of the Year.

Offensive selections

Quarterbacks
Andrew Luck#, Stanford (Coaches-1)
Darron Thomas, Oregon (Coaches-2)

Running backs
LaMichael James, Oregon (Coaches-1)
Owen Marecic, Stanford (Coaches-1)
Jacquizz Rodgers, Oregon St. (Coaches-1)
Johnathan Franklin, UCLA (Coaches-2)
Chris Polk, Washington (Coaches-2)
Shane Vereen, California (Coaches-2)

Wide receivers
Juron Criner#, Arizona (Coaches-1)
Jeff Maehl, Oregon (Coaches-1)
Doug Baldwin, Stanford (Coaches-2)
Jermaine Kearse, Washington (Coaches-2)

Tight ends
David Paulson, Oregon (Coaches-1)
Coby Fleener, Stanford (Coaches-2)

Linemen
Jonathan Martin, Stanford (Coaches-1)
David DeCastro, Stanford (Coaches-1)
Chase Beeler, Stanford (Coaches-1)
Jordan Holmes, Oregon (Coaches-1)
Tyron Smith, USC (Coaches-1)
Colin Baxter, Arizona (Coaches-2)
Adam Grant, Arizona (Coaches-2)
Alex Linnenkohl, Oregon St. (Coaches-2)
Mitchell Schwartz, California (Coaches-2)
Bo Thran, Oregon (Coaches-2)

Defensive selections

Linemen
Jurrell Casey, USC (Coaches-1)
Cameron Jordan, California (Coaches-1)
Stephen Paea, Oregon St. (Coaches-1)
Brooks Reed, Arizona (Coaches-1)
Brandon Bair, Oregon (Coaches-2)
Ricky Elmore, Arizona (Coaches-2)
Sione Fua, Stanford (Coaches-2)
Kenny Rowe, Oregon (Coaches-2)

Linebackers
Akeem Ayers, UCLA (Coaches-1)
Mason Foster, Washington (Coaches-1)
Casey Matthews, Oregon (Coaches-1)
Vontaze Burfict, Arizona St. (Coaches-2)
Mychal Kendricks, California (Coaches-2)
Mike Mohamed, California (Coaches-2)

Backs
Omar Bolden, Arizona St. (Coaches-1)
Chris Conte, California (Coaches-1)
Talmadge Jackson, Oregon (Coaches-1)
Rahim Moore, UCLA (Coaches-1)
Cliff Harris, Oregon (Coaches-2)
Delano Howell, Stanford (Coaches-2)
T. J. McDonald, USC (Coaches-2)
Nate Williams, Washington (Coaches-2)

Special teams

Placekickers
Nate Whitaker, Stanford (Coaches-1)
Kai Forbath, UCLA (Coaches-2)

Punters
Bryan Anger, California (Coaches-1)
Jeff Locke, UCLA (Coaches-2)

Return specialists 
Cliff Harris#, Oregon (Coaches-1)
Robert Woods, USC (Coaches-1)
Omar Bolden, Arizona St. (Coaches-2)
Ronald Johnson, USC (Coaches-2)

Special teams player
Chike Amajoyi, Stanford (Coaches-1)
Bryson Littlejohn, Oregon (Coaches-2)

Key
Coaches = selected by Pac-12 coaches

# = unanimous selection by coaches

See also
2010 College Football All-America Team

References

All-Pacific-10 Conference Football Team
All-Pac-12 Conference football teams